Dr. Shpresa Kureta (born 28 April 1959 in Korçë) is the Albanian ambassador to Poland. She is also Ambassador Non-resident to Estonia, Latvia, Lithuania, and Ukraine. Kureta began her tenure in September 2014.

Kureta was also ambassador to Austria from 2001 until 2005.

References

Ambassadors of Albania to Poland
Albanian women ambassadors
Ambassadors of Albania to Ukraine
Ambassadors of Albania to Lithuania
Ambassadors of Albania to Latvia
Ambassadors of Albania to Estonia
Ambassadors of Albania to Austria
1959 births
Living people